Echinocorys is an extinct genus of echinoids that lived from the Late Cretaceous to the Paleocene. The genus belongs to the Holasteridae family. Its remains have been found in Asia, Europe, Australia (Oceania) and North America.

Sources
 Fossils (Smithsonian Handbooks) by David Ward (Page 182)

External links
Echinocorys in the Paleobiology Database

Holasteroida
Prehistoric echinoid genera
Cretaceous echinoderms
Paleocene echinoderms
Prehistoric echinoderms of Asia
Prehistoric echinoderms of Europe
Prehistoric echinoderms of North America
Late Cretaceous genus first appearances
Paleocene genus extinctions